Nerilka's Story is a science fiction novella by the American-Irish author Anne McCaffrey. Nerilka's Story became the eighth book in the Dragonriders of Pern volume series.

Moreta (1983) and its sequel Nerilka (1985) are companion stories, in that the latter narrates a second perspective on major events of the former. It was the first work in the series following publication of The Atlas of Pern, and so is not covered in the Atlas.

Plot summary
Taking a different approach from the previous seven books in the series, Nerilka's Story has a non-dragonrider and non-harper as its major viewpoint character. It is set during the events detailed in Moreta: Dragonlady of Pern. Nerilka is the daughter of a Lord Holder who turns her back on her life in an upper-class family and sets out to fight the disease that threatens to kill all humans on Pern. According to a critic for the Chicago Tribune, Nerilka makes for an "intelligent, resourceful, selfless and, alas, homely" heroine.

Reception
Critics have called Nerilka a story with "terse power". It was first published in 1985. The novel reached #7 on TIME Magazine's Best Sellers list for fiction on April 7 and 21, 1986. On the New York Times Best Seller list for paperbacks, it first appeared on February 22, 1987, at #12, and reached #11 the week after.

Notes

References

Citations – books

External links

1986 novels
1986 science fiction novels
Dragonriders of Pern books
Novels by Anne McCaffrey
Del Rey books